Portage Historic District is a national historic district located in Portage, Pennsylvania.

Portage Historic District may also refer to:

Portage Industrial Waterfront Historic District in Portage, Wisconsin
Portage Retail Historic District in Portage, Wisconsin
Portage Street Historic District in Lodi, Wisconsin